Stephanie Louise Kwolek (July 31, 1923 – June 18, 2014) was a Polish-American chemist who is known for inventing Kevlar. Her career at the DuPont company spanned more than 40 years. She discovered the first of a family of synthetic fibers of exceptional strength and stiffness: poly-paraphenylene terephthalamide.

For her discovery, Kwolek was awarded the DuPont company's Lavoisier Medal for outstanding technical achievement. As of August 2019, she was the only female employee to have received that honor. In 1995 she became the fourth woman to be added to the National Inventors Hall of Fame.  Kwolek won numerous awards for her work in polymer chemistry, including the National Medal of Technology, the IRI Achievement Award and the Perkin Medal.

Early life and education

Kwolek was one of two children born to Polish immigrant parents in the Pittsburgh suburb of New Kensington, Pennsylvania, in 1923. The grade school she attended was small enough to require her classroom be shared by two different grades, and as Kwolek's love of science grew, she easily outpaced even the older children across the room. Her father, John Kwolek, died when she was ten years old. He was a naturalist by avocation, and Kwolek spent hours with him, as a child, exploring the natural world. They would spend afternoons together exploring the woods nearby, collecting plants and observing animals that they would later name and characterize in a scrapbook Kwolek kept as a child. She attributed her interest in science to him and an interest in fashion design to her mother, Nellie (Zajdel) Kwolek, who worked as a seamstress. Her mother told her that she was too much of a perfectionist to work a career in fashion, so Kwolek decided to become a doctor.

In 1946, Stephanie earned a Bachelor of Science degree with a major in chemistry from Margaret Morrison Carnegie College of Carnegie Mellon University. She had planned to become a doctor and hoped she could earn enough money from a temporary job in a chemistry-related field to attend medical school.

DuPont career
William Hale Charch, a future mentor, offered Kwolek a position at DuPont's Buffalo, New York, facility in 1946.  As a chemical company, Dupont was trying to find a petroleum-based polymer fibre that would be lighter and harder-wearing than steel in radial tires.  The firm had vacancies, given that many men had been overseas fighting in the war.  Dupont had introduced nylon shortly before World War Two, and that business boomed and blossomed into a variety of textile applications.  
  
At the same time, the protracted Second World War emphasized the need for a lightweight, wearable armour to protect personnel and equipment.  As the war raged overseas, soldiers engaged in battle had to forge body armor because there was no material strong enough to stop a bullet (even from infantry rifles) but light enough to wear in battle. Steel was the only armor material available, and its weight limited its use to tanks.  Even then, steel could be pierced by specialized weaponry. 

Kwolek only intended to work for DuPont temporarily, in order to raise money for further study. After she found polymer-chemistry interesting, she decided to stay and her research group moved to Wilmington, Delaware, in 1950.  In 1959, she won a publication award from the American Chemical Society (ACS), the first of many awards.
 The paper, The Nylon Rope Trick, demonstrated a way of producing nylon in a beaker at room temperature. It is still a common classroom experiment, and the process was extended to high molecular weight polyamides. In 1985, Kwolek and coworkers patented a method for preparing PBO and PBT polymers. Because Dupont was at the cutting edge of polymer technologies and innovation, Kwolek never outgrew the position and spent her whole career doing research at Dupont. Over her 40-year career at Dupont, Kwolek would file 28 patents. In addition to Kevlar, she contributed to products such as Spandex (Lycra), Nomex, and Kapton.(mit) She continued as a consultant to Dupont after her retirement in 1986, and became the first woman to earn the company’s Lavoisier medal for research in 1995. 

She was engaged in the search for new polymers as well as a new condensation process that takes place at lower temperatures—about 0° to 40°C. The melt condensation polymerization process used in preparing nylon, for example, was instead done at more than 200°C. The lower-temperature polycondensation processes, which employ very fast-reacting intermediates, make it possible to prepare polymers that cannot be melted and only begin to decompose at temperatures above 400°C.

Kevlar
Kwolek is best known for her work during the 1950s and 1960s with aramids, or "aromatic polyamides", a type of polymer that can be made into strong, stiff, and flame-resistant fibres. Her laboratory work in aramids was conducted under the supervision of research fellow Paul W. Morgan, who calculated that the aramids would form stiff fibres owing to the presence of bulky benzene (or "aromatic") rings in their molecular chains but that they would have to be prepared from solution because they melt only at very high temperatures. Kwolek determined the solvents and polymerization conditions suitable for producing poly-m-phenylene isophthalamide, a compound that DuPont released in 1961 as a flame-resistant fibre with the trade name Nomex. She then extended her work into poly-p-benzamide and poly-p-phenylene terephthalamide, which she noted adopted highly regular rodlike molecular arrangements in solution. From these two "liquid crystal polymers" (the first ever prepared), fibres were spun that displayed unprecedented stiffness and tensile strength. The innovative polymer Poly-p-phenylene terephthalamide, as invented by Kwolek, was released commercially under the name Kevlar. 
 
In 1964, in anticipation of a gasoline shortage, Kwolek's group began searching for a lightweight yet strong fiber to replace the steel used in tires.

As she explained in a 1993 speech:
The solution was unusually (low viscosity), turbid, stir-opalescent and buttermilk in appearance. Conventional polymer solutions are usually clear or translucent and have the viscosity of molasses, more or less. The solution that I prepared looked like a dispersion but was totally filterable through a fine pore filter. This was a liquid crystalline solution, but I did not know it at the time.

This sort of cloudy solution was usually thrown away. Kwolek was denied the use of the spinneret for her solution because it was thought the solution would clog the machine. However, Kwolek persuaded technician Charles Smullen, who ran the spinneret, to test her solution. She was amazed to find that the new fiber would not break when nylon typically would. Not only was it stronger than nylon, Kevlar was five times stronger than steel by weight. Both her supervisor and the laboratory director 
understood the significance of her discovery, and a new field of polymer chemistry quickly arose. By 1971, modern Kevlar was introduced. Kwolek learned that the fibers could be made even stronger by heat-treating them. The polymer molecules, shaped like rods or matchsticks, are highly oriented, which gives Kevlar its extraordinary strength. Kwolek continued research of thermotropic Kevlar derivatives containing aliphatic and chlorine groups.

Applications of Kevlar
Kwolek was not much involved in developing practical applications of Kevlar. Once senior DuPont managers were informed of the discovery, "they immediately assigned a whole group to work on different aspects", she said. Still, Kwolek continued research on Kevlar derivatives. She did not profit from DuPont's products, as she signed over the Kevlar patent to the company.

Kevlar is used in more than 200 applications, including tennis rackets, skis, parachute lines, boats, airplanes, ropes, cables, and bullet-proof vests. It has been used for car tires, fire fighter boots, hockey sticks, cut-resistant gloves and armored cars. It has also been used for protective building materials like bomb-proof materials, hurricane safe rooms, and bridge reinforcements. During the week of Kwolek's death, the one millionth bullet-resistant vest made with Kevlar was sold. Kevlar is also used to build cell phone cases; Motorola's Droid RAZR has a Kevlar unibody.

Awards and honors 
For her discovery of Kevlar, Kwolek was awarded the DuPont company's Lavoisier Medal for outstanding technical achievement in 1995, as a "Persistent experimentalist and role model whose discovery of liquid crystalline polyamides led to Kevlar aramid fibers."  At the time of her death in 2014, she was still the only female employee to receive that honor. Her discovery generated several billion dollars of revenue for DuPont, being her employer at the time, but she never benefited directly from it financially.

In 1980, Kwolek received the Chemical Pioneer Award from the American Institute of Chemists, and an Award for Creative Invention from the American Chemical Society. In 1995, Kwolek was added to the National Inventors Hall of Fame. In 1996, she received the National Medal of Technology and the IRI Achievement Award. In 1997, she received the Perkin Medal from the American Chemical Society. In 2003, she was inducted into the National Women's Hall of Fame.

She has been awarded honorary degrees by Carnegie Mellon University (2001), Worcester Polytechnic Institute (1981) and Clarkson University (1997).

The Royal Society of Chemistry grants a biennial 'Stephanie L Kwolek Award', "to recognise exceptional contributions to the area of materials chemistry from a scientist working outside the UK".

Kwolek is featured as one of the Royal Society of Chemistry 175 Faces of Chemistry.

Later life 
In 1986, Kwolek retired as a research associate for DuPont. Toward the end of her life, she consulted for DuPont, and served on both the National Research Council and the National Academy of Sciences. During her 40 years as a research scientist, she filed and received either 17 or 28 patents.

She often tutored students in chemistry. She also devised and wrote about numerous classroom demonstrations that are still used in schools today, such as the Nylon Rope Trick.

Kwolek died at the age of 90 on June 18, 2014. Her funeral was at St Joseph on the Brandywine.

See also
Women in science
Women in science, engineering and technology

References

Further reading

External links

 Stephanie Kwolek at Famous Women Inventors
 
  
 
 Oral history interview with Stephanie L. Kwolek (1986) from Science History Institute Digital Collections
 Oral history interview with Stephanie L. Kwolek (1998) from Science History Institute Digital Collections
 Stephanie L. Kwolek papers at Hagley Museum and Library.
 Stephanie Kwolek photographs and videotapes at Hagley Museum and Library.
 Stephanie Kwolek photographs at Hagley Museum and Library.

1923 births
2014 deaths
American women chemists
Women inventors
Members of the United States National Academy of Engineering
National Medal of Technology recipients
Howard N. Potts Medal recipients
DuPont people
Lemelson–MIT Prize
Carnegie Mellon University alumni
People from New Kensington, Pennsylvania
American people of Polish descent
20th-century American chemists
20th-century American inventors
20th-century American women scientists
Scientists from Delaware
Catholic Church and science